Lobau is a floodplain in Vienna.

Löbau is a city in Saxony, Germany.

Lobau or Löbau may also refer to:
 German name for Lubawa, town formerly in West Prussia, currently in Poland
 Battle of Löbau, fought near Lubawa in 1263
 The former district of Löbau-Zittau in Saxony
 Lobau River, a river of Viti Levu, Fiji

People 
 Georges Mouton, Count de Lobau (1770–1838), Marshal of France
 Eduard Lobau (born 1988), Belarusian activist
 Eva Löbau (born 1972), Austrian actress